The 2004 Internazionali Femminili di Palermo was a women's tennis tournament played on outdoor clay courts in Palermo, Italy that was part of the Tier V category of the 2004 WTA Tour. It was the 17th edition of the Internazionali Femminili di Palermo and took place from 19 July until 25 July 2004. Second-seeded Anabel Medina Garrigues won the singles title and earned $16,000 first-prize money.

Finals

Singles
 Anabel Medina Garrigues defeated  Flavia Pennetta, 6–4, 6–4
 It was Medina Garrigues' 1st singles title of the year and the 2nd of her career.

Doubles
 Anabel Medina Garrigues /  Arantxa Sánchez Vicario defeated  Ľubomíra Kurhajcová /  Henrieta Nagyová, 6–3, 7–6(7–4)

References

External sources
 ITF tournament edition details
 Tournament draws

Torneo Internazionali Femminili di Palermo
Torneo Internazionali Femminili di Palermo
Internazionali Femminili di Palermo
Torneo